Detective Barbie is a series of three mystery themed point and click adventure games starring the character Barbie. The series consists of Detective Barbie In the Mystery of the Carnival Caper! (1998) Detective Barbie 2: The Vacation Mystery (1999), and Detective Barbie: The Mystery Cruise (2000). The first two games were developed by Gorilla Systems Corporation and published on the PC by Mattel Media/Mattel Interactive. The third game was developed for the PlayStation by Runecraft.

History 
The games were sold with pink-and-silver Barbie PCs.

Detective Barbie In the Mystery of the Carnival Caper! was the 9th top-selling computer game at 13 software retail chains representing 53 percent of the U.S. market for the week that ended December 5, 1998.

Plot

Detective Barbie In the Mystery of the Carnival Caper! 
Ken went to a local carnival and volunteered for a disappearing magic trick and now he can't be found. It is up the player to locate him. Tasks include gathering clues in specific locations of the park, solving puzzles, and playing mini-games.

Detective Barbie 2: The Vacation Mystery 
Team Barbie Detective (Barbie, Ken, and a wheelchair-using computer whiz named Becky) solve a mystery regarding a series of antique jewels that have been stolen at Lighthouse Cove hotel. Players can use the Barbie GamePad to play the game. Clues are on different locations each new game. Clues bring Barbie closer to solving the mystery and make her find puzzle pieces that contains a mysterious message on the back once fully assembled.

Detective Barbie: The Mystery Cruise 
Announced on November 20, 2000, this was a two-player game. The premise involves Barbie investigating the disappearance of artworks from a cruise ship.

Gameplay 
In the case of the computer games, the entire game has a standard point-and-click style controlled via a mouse. Players move Barbie to a new location by moving the mouse to the edge of the screen, where the cursor will turn into a big pink arrow. Players click on hotspots to interact with them, while interacting with characters to uncover clues.

Critical reception

Detective Barbie In the Mystery of the Carnival Caper! 
Richard Cobbett of PC Gamer said the game had neither glitz nor glamour. SuperKids said "persistence, patience, and good directional abilities" were required to solve the case, instead of logic and deductive reasoning skills. Russian website 7Wolf wrote that the graphics were simple, but that it was a good game for girls to unite around. Michelle Regna, writing for Buzzfeed, said the best part of the game was its rides, such as the "Tunnel of Love". Drew Dakessian of Wired said that the game "enabled me to live out my girl-gumshoe dreams."

Detective Barbie 2: The Vacation Mystery 
SuperKids thought the game may be too difficult for young players, and recommended that people with short attention spans should stay away from it. The Boston Herald thought the game wasn't innovative but that it would still provide hours of entertainment, though it did describe the game as one of the "hottest new releases" in the children's interactive software space.

References 

Barbie video games
Detective video games
Gorilla Systems games
Point-and-click adventure games
Video game franchises introduced in 1998
Video games developed in the United States
Windows games
Works about vacationing